Ta Kalitera Mou Tragoudia is the title of a 1980 greatest hits album by Anna Vissi. It was released in Greece and Cyprus by Minos after her departure from the label and having signed with EMI Columbia Greece. 

It features songs from her only personal album with the company, As Kanoume Apopse Mian Arhi, which is also her debut album, as well as beloved songs from her participation in other artists' albums, like the legendary Mikis Theodorakis and other influential artists like George Dalaras. At that time in the Greek music industry, the privilege of recording and releasing a personal album was granted to an artist who proved their merit by having collaborated with other established musicians and recording artists.

Track listing
 "Νa' Mouna Sta Heria Sou Karavi" (I was in the hands of your boat)
 "Krivame Tin Agapi Mou" (We hide our love)
 "Giati Gelas" (Why are you laughing?)
 "To Palio T' Aeroplano" (The old plane)
 "To Pallikari" (The stalwart)
 "O Kirios Nobel" (Mr. Nobel)
 "Agapise Me" (Love me)
 "San Ta Pinasmena Peristeria" (Like hungry pigeons)
 "Oute Ena S' Agapo" (Not even one "I love you")
 "Mia Mikri Psihoula" (A little soul)
 "Fexe Hlomo Feggari Mou" (Shine my pale Moon)
 "O, Maria" (Oh! Maria)

Greek-language albums
1980 compilation albums
Anna Vissi compilation albums
Minos EMI compilation albums